Stepan Petrovych Ivakhiv (born 24 January 1968) is a Ukrainian businessman and politician currently serving as a People's Deputy of Ukraine representing Ukraine's 21st electoral district as a member of For the Future since 2019, having previously represented the district as an independent since 2012. He is co-owner of the Continuum FIG and the WOG gas station network, and is among the 100 richest people in Ukraine.

Biography 
He was born on 24 January 1968, in the village of Andriyivka, Busk district, Lviv Oblast.

In 1992 he graduated from the Rivne Institute of Water Management.

Business activity 
Founder and co-owner of FIG "Continuum".

As of 2019, Ivakhiv's fortune is estimated at $93 million.

Political activity 
In 2010 he was elected a deputy of the Volyn regional council in a multi-member constituency on the electoral list of the Volyn regional organization of the Party of Regions. Member of the Standing Committee on International Cooperation, Foreign Economic Relations and Investment. 

In the 2012 parliamentary election, he ran for the Verkhovna Rada (Ukraine's parliament) as a self-nominated candidate in Ukraine's 21st electoral district (Kovel, Kovel, Ratniv, Starovyzhiv, Shatsk districts) and won, receiving more than 37% of the vote and less than one percent ahead of Ihor Huz.

On 1 November 2018, he was included in the sanctions list of Russia.

On 29 August 2019, he joined the For the Future faction in the Verkhovna Rada. 

Since 29 August 2019, Ivakhiv is First Deputy Chairman of the Verkhovna Rada Committee on Environmental Policy and Nature Management. Member of the Group for Interparliamentary Relations with the Czech Republic since 19 November 2019. Since 18 December 2019, a member of the group for inter-parliamentary relations with Sweden. Member of the Group for Inter-Parliamentary Relations with Slovenia since 18 December 2019. He has been a member of the Inter-Parliamentary Relations Group with Canada since 15 October 2019.

References 

1968 births
Living people
Seventh convocation members of the Verkhovna Rada
Eighth convocation members of the Verkhovna Rada
Ninth convocation members of the Verkhovna Rada
Independent politicians in Ukraine
People from Lviv Oblast
Ukrainian businesspeople
Ukrainian politicians